The France national under-19 speedway team is the national under-19 motorcycle speedway team of France and is controlled by the French Motorcycling Federation. The team participated in the 2008 Team Speedway Junior European Championship, but failed to qualify for the final. Only one rider, Mathieu Tresarrieu, has qualified for the Individual competition final (twice, in 2004 and 2005).

Competition

Riders 
Riders who started in Individual Speedway Junior European Championship:

 Mathieu Tresarrieu (2004 - 16th, 2005 - 11th)
 Pavol Pucko (2008)
 Theo di Palma (2009)
 Maxime Mazeau (2009)

See also 
 France national speedway team
 France national under-21 speedway team

External links 
 (fr) Fédération Française de Motocyclisme webside

National speedway teams
Speedway
Speedway